Upper Silesian may refer to:

 a person from Upper Silesia
 the West Slavic Silesian language
 a person from the former Prussian Province of Upper Silesia